The Robert Foster Cherry Award is a prize given biennially by Baylor University for "great teaching". The Cherry Award honors professors at the College or University level, in the English-speaking world, with established track records of teaching excellence and the ability to inspire students. Robert Foster Cherry, a graduate of Baylor University (A.B., 1929), made an estate bequest to establish the award. In a typical award cycle, three Finalists are selected based on nomination packages. The Finalists then compete for the award by giving a series of lectures at Baylor University. Each Finalist receives $15,000 and the ultimate award Recipient receives an additional $250,000 prize. Although the Nobel Foundation doesn't award a Nobel prize for teaching,  the Cherry Award is often dubbed as the highest teaching award in the world or the "Nobel Prize" for teaching.

Recipients and Finalists

Recipients 
2022, Hollylynne S. Lee, North Carolina State University (Mathematics)
2020, Jennifer Cognard-Black, St. Mary’s College of Maryland (English)
2018, Neil Garg, UCLA (Chemistry)
2016,  Mikki Hebl, Rice University (Psychology & Management)
2014,  Meera Chandrasekhar, University of Missouri (Physics) 
2012, Brian Coppola, University of Michigan (Chemistry)  
2010,  Edward B. Burger, Williams College (Mathematics)  
2008,  Stephen D. Davis, Pepperdine University (Biology) 
2006, Anton Armstrong, St. Olaf College (Choral Music)
2004,  Eleonore Stump, Saint Louis University (Philosophy)
1998, Robert H. Bell, Williams College (English) and Paul G. Ashdown (Journalism)

Finalists 
2022
Jeb Barnes, University of Southern California (Political science and international relations)

Randy W. Roberts, Purdue University (History)
2020
Nancy F. Dana, University of Florida (Education)

Reuben A. B. May, Texas A&M University (Sociology)

2018 
Heidi G. Elmendorf, Georgetown University (Biology)

Clinton O. Longenecker, The University of Toledo (Leadership)

2016 
Teresa C. Balser, Curtin University (Soil and Water Science)

Lisa R. Spaar, University of Virginia (English)

2014 
Joan B. Connelly, New York University (Art History and Classics)

Michael K. Salemi, University of North Carolina, Chapel Hill (Economics)

2012 
Heather Macdonald, College of William & Mary (Geology)

Allen Mattusow, Rice University (History)

2010 
Roger Rosenblatt, Stony Brook University (English)

Elliott West, University of Arkansas (History)

2008 
George E. Andrews, Pennsylvania State University (Mathematics)

Rudy Pozzatti, Indiana University (Art)

2006 
Robert W. Brown, Case Western Reserve University (Physics)

William R. Cook, SUNY Genesseo (History)

2004 
Harry Stout, Yale University (Religious Studies)

Nicholas Wolterstorff, Yale University Divinity School (Religion)

References

External links
 The Robert Foster Cherry Award for Great Teaching

Education awards
Teacher awards